Bishkek Humanities University or BSU is a public university located in Bishkek, the capital of Kyrgyzstan. The university was named after K. Karasaev.

History 
The university was established in 1979 when the Kirgiz SSR was still a part of the Soviet Union. On 17 June 1992 it was transformed into the State Institute of Languages and Humanities. Following an announcement made by the newly formed Kyrgyz government, the university was re-established in 1994.

Structure 
The university offers both undergraduate and postgraduate courses.

References

External links 

 

1979 establishments in the Kirghiz Soviet Socialist Republic
Educational institutions established in 1979
Universities in Bishkek